William Ewart (1 May 179823 January 1869) was a British politician. In 1863, Ewart conceived the idea of a blue plaque to commemorate a link between a location and a famous person or event, serving as a historical marker. It is the oldest such scheme in the world.

Life
Ewart was born in Liverpool on 1 May 1798. He was educated at Eton and Christ Church, Oxford, gaining the Newdigate prize for English verse. He was called to the bar at the Middle Temple in 1827, and the next year entered Parliament for the borough of Bletchingley in Surrey, serving until 1830. He subsequently sat for Liverpool from 1830 to 1837, for Wigan from 1839 to 1841, and for Dumfries Burghs from 1841 until his retirement from public life in 1868. He died at his home, Broadleas House, near Devizes, Wiltshire, on 23 January 1869.

Ewart, who was an advanced liberal in politics, was responsible during his long political career for many useful measures. In 1834 he successfully carried a bill to abolish hanging in chains, and in 1837 he was successful in getting an act passed to abolish capital punishment for cattle-stealing and other similar offences. In 1850 he carried a bill for establishing free libraries supported out of public rates, and he was instrumental in getting the Metric Weights and Measures Act 1864 passed to legalise the use of the metric system.

He remained a strong advocate for the abolition of capital punishment, and on his motion in 1864, a Royal Commission was appointed to consider the subject on which he sat. Other reforms which he advocated and which were carried out included an annual statement on education, and the examination of candidates for the civil service and army.

He was a close friend of the Reverend William Gaskell and his wife, the writer Elizabeth Gaskell, and the couple often stayed at Broadleas House. Ewart's daughter, Mary, was Elizabeth Gaskell's close confidante.

See also
List of statues and sculptures in Liverpool

Gallery

References

Notes

External links 
 

1798 births
1869 deaths
Members of the Parliament of the United Kingdom for Scottish constituencies
UK MPs 1826–1830
UK MPs 1830–1831
UK MPs 1831–1832
UK MPs 1832–1835
UK MPs 1835–1837
UK MPs 1837–1841
UK MPs 1841–1847
UK MPs 1847–1852
UK MPs 1852–1857
UK MPs 1857–1859
UK MPs 1859–1865
UK MPs 1865–1868
Members of the Parliament of the United Kingdom for Liverpool
British anti–death penalty activists
Alumni of Christ Church, Oxford
People educated at Eton College
Members of the Parliament of the United Kingdom for Wigan